Lançon-Provence (also known as Lançon-de-Provence) is a commune in the Bouches-du-Rhône department in southern France.

Population

See also
Communes of the Bouches-du-Rhône department

References

External links
  Official website

Communes of Bouches-du-Rhône
Bouches-du-Rhône communes articles needing translation from French Wikipedia